Rachel Weinberg is a French film director, screenwriter and actress, born on 25 October 1929 in Roanne, Loire.

Filmography 
Director
1971 : Pic et pic et colegram with Monique Chaumette, Jean-Paul Tribout and Henri Garcin
1974 : L'Ampélopède with Isabelle Huppert and Jean Pignol ; (also screenwriter)
1981 : La Flambeuse with Lea Massari, Laurent Terzieff, Didier Sauvegrain, Claude Brosset and Gérard Blain ; (also screenwriter)

Actress
1973 : Monsieur Émilien est mort, telefilm directed by Jean Pignol with Jean-Roger Caussimon, Françoise Seigner and Roger Souza

External links 
 

French film directors
French screenwriters
French television actresses
1929 births
Living people
French women film directors
French women screenwriters
People from Roanne